Sven Lysholt Hansen (born 28 June 1945) is a Danish rower. He competed in the men's coxed pair event at the 1960 Summer Olympics.

References

External links
 

1945 births
Living people
Danish male rowers
Olympic rowers of Denmark
Rowers at the 1960 Summer Olympics
People from Faxe Municipality
Sportspeople from Region Zealand